Sweden competed at the 1956 Winter Olympics in Cortina d'Ampezzo, Italy.

Medalists

Alpine skiing

Men

Women

Bobsleigh

Cross-country skiing

Men

Men's 4 × 10 km relay

Women

Women's 3 x 5 km relay

Figure skating

Women

Ice hockey

Summary

Group C
Top two teams advanced to medal round.

USSR 5–1 Sweden
Sweden 6–5 Switzerland

Games for 1st-6th places

USSR 4–1 Sweden
Sweden 5–0 Czechoslovakia
USA 6–1 Sweden
Canada 6–2 Sweden
Germany (UTG) 1–1 Sweden

Nordic combined 

Events:
 normal hill ski jumping (Three jumps, best two counted and shown here.)
 15 km cross-country skiing

Ski jumping

Speed skating

Men

References
 Olympic Winter Games 1956, full results by sports-reference.com

Nations at the 1956 Winter Olympics
1956
Olympics, Winter